Fedje is an island municipality in the Nordhordland region of Vestland county, Norway. The administrative centre of the municipality is the village of Fedje. The traditional economic activity of the inhabitants is fishing.

The  municipality is the 354th largest by area out of the 356 municipalities in Norway. Fedje is the 350th most populous municipality in Norway with a population of 502. The municipality consists of the main island of Fedje which is also surrounded by about 125 smaller islands and rocks mostly north of the main island. The name Fedje applies both to the main island, the main village, and to all the islands and rocks as a whole municipality.

In 2016, the chief of police for Vestlandet formally suggested a reconfiguration of police districts and stations. He proposed that the police station in Fedje be closed.

General information

Historically, the islands of Fedje belonged to the prestegjeld of Lindås. In 1910, the northwestern part of Lindås was separated to become the new Austrheim Municipality (which included Fedje). On 1 January 1947, all of Austrheim located west of the Fedjefjorden (population: 920) was separated to become the new municipality of Fedje.

Name
The Old Norse form of the name was Feðjar, closely related to Gothic word "faþa" which means "fence" or "wall". The meaning here refers to a row of islands or archipelago, separating the inshore waters (now called the Fedjefjorden) from the ocean.

Coat of arms
The coat of arms was granted on 13 July 1990. The arms show two silver or white oars on a blue background. This symbolizes the rich boating history of this island municipality.

Churches
The Church of Norway has one parish within the municipality of Fedje. It is part of the Nordhordland prosti (deanery) in the Diocese of Bjørgvin.

Education
Fedje has an elementary school, and a junior high school, both of which are situated in the center of the island, and in the same building. The school is also used as a movie theater twice a week.

History

{{Historical populations
|footnote = Source: Statistics Norway.
|shading = off
|1951|940
|1960|932
|1970|873
|1980|849
|1990|730
|2000|682
|2010|594
|2019|562
}}
There are traces of human activity on Fedje from as long as 4,000 years ago. In the 18th century, the village of Fedje was an important trading place, with the small island of Kræmmerholmen being the location where the trading took place. Kræmmerholmen was reopened in 1991, and was a restaurant/hotel/museum area, but closed in September 2008. Fedje was previously a substantial producer of peat. The peat led to the construction of a railway. The railway was given up together with the peat industry in 1920.

During the Second World War Fedje was occupied by over 300 German soldiers. There are still remains of the German cannons and bunkers all over the island, especially in the western part close to the traffic station, which is actually built on the remains of a German radar station.

In February 1945, the German U-boat U-864 was sunk by the Royal Navy submarine  outside western Fedj, the only instance in history of a submarine being sunk by another submarine while both were submerged. Its cargo included 67 short tons (61 t)  of mercury which was being shipped to Japan. Contained in 1,857 rusting steel bottles in the vessel's keel, the mercury was discovered to be leaking out and currently poses a severe environmental threat. The rusting mercury bottles, the delicate condition of the wreck, and the presence of live torpedoes aboard it make the raising or salvage of U-864 extremely hazardous, and it has instead been proposed that the wreck be entombed.

On 12 January 2007, M/V Server sunk outside Fedje. The ship leaked oil and caused major environmental damage. But due to intensive efforts to clean the coves and beaches, very few traces can be found today.

Government
All municipalities in Norway, including Fedje, are responsible for primary education (through 10th grade), outpatient health services, senior citizen services, unemployment and other social services, zoning, economic development, and municipal roads. The municipality is governed by a municipal council of elected representatives, which in turn elect a mayor.  The municipality falls under the Hordaland District Court and the Gulating Court of Appeal.

Municipal council
The municipal council of Fedje is made up of 15 representatives that are elected to four year terms. The party breakdown of the council is as follows:

Mayor
The mayors of Fedje (incomplete list):
2015–present: Stian Herøy (H)
2007-2015: Kristin Handeland (Ap)
2003-2007: Erling Walderhaug (H)
1995-2003: Vilgjerd Storset Husa (KrF)
1992-1995: Erling Walderhaug (H)
1990-1991: Ove Villanger (KrF)
1980-1989: Erling Walderhaug (H)
1976-1979: Karl Storhaug (DNF)
1948-1975: Oskar Tangen (V)

Geography

The largest lake is Storevatnet.

Islands
Other than the main island of Fedje, the best known smaller island is called Holmengrå. In the southern part of Fedje which is called Stormark'', there is a lighthouse called Hellisøy Lighthouse, maybe the most famous feature of Fedje. Hellisøy Lighthouse was built in 1855. The islands of Fedje are all located on the western side of the Fedjefjorden.

People
The population of the island community is decreasing due to the high percentage of people over 60 years (25% as of 1 January 2003), and because many people decide to move from the island, many because of the lack of work.

Most of the people live on the lagoon-like northern part of the island in the village of Fedje where there is a grocery store, Fedje Church, and the ferry quay. Fedje used to be inhabited by fishermen and whalers. These days many are working on commercial ships or in the oil industry. By doing so they can still live on the island without having to work there.

Sports

The main sporting activity on Fedje is football, which can be played on the football grounds in the eastern part of the island. The football ground is also the home ground of the local football team called Fedje A-lag. The club is currently playing in the Norwegian 6th division. 
Swimming is also popular, as there is a beautiful beach located on Fedje, which is to be found in the centre of the island on the shoreline of Lake Husavatnet. The water is clean and brackish, as it has a small opening to the sea which makes the tide flush it with sea water from time to time.

Infrastructure
Fedje Vessel Traffic Service Centre has been operating since 1 September 1992. It surveys the coast to allow safe passage to Mongstad and Sture. It also serves as a pilot station. Next to the station is Fedje Heliport, Høgden.

The island is supplied with power, telephone, and internet cables from an underwater cordless router to the mainland. A ferry, crossing 20 times a day, connects Fedje to the mainland. The voyage lasts for about 30 minutes. Fedje is about a 1-hour 40 minute drive (including a 30-minute ferry voyage) from the city of Bergen.

Notable people 
 Gisle Handeland (born 1943 in Fedje) a Norwegian politician, county mayor of Hordaland 1993-2003
 Vidar Kleppe (born 1963) a somewhat controversial Norwegian politician, brought up in Fedje

References

External links

Municipal fact sheet from Statistics Norway 

 
Municipalities of Vestland
1947 establishments in Norway